Del Rey Oaks (Del Rey, Spanish for "Of the King") is a city in Monterey County, California, United States. The population was 1,592 at the 2020 census. Del Rey Oaks is a member of the Association of Monterey Bay Area Governments, a regional government agency.

History
The town was formerly known as Del Rey Woods.

Geography
It is bordered to the north by the city of Seaside and to the west and south by Monterey. California State Route 218 (Canyon Del Rey Boulevard) is the main road through Del Rey Oaks, leading northwest to State Route 1 at Monterey State Beach and southeast to State Route 68 just outside the city limits.

Climate
The region experiences warm (but not hot) and dry summers, with no average monthly temperatures above 71.6 °F. According to the Köppen Climate Classification system, Del Rey Oaks has a warm-summer Mediterranean climate, abbreviated "Csb" on climate maps.

History
Prior to incorporation (on September 3, 1953) the town was called Del Rey Woods. The Del Rey Oaks post office opened in 1968.

Demographics

2010
The 2010 United States Census reported that Del Rey Oaks had a population of 1,624. The racial makeup of Del Rey Oaks was 1,326 (81.7%) White, 16 (1.0%) African American, 12 (0.7%) Native American, 128 (7.9%) Asian, 4 (0.2%) Pacific Islander, 52 (3.2%) from other races, and 86 (5.3%) from two or more races. Hispanic or Latino of any race were 169 people (10.4%).

The census reported that 1,624 people (100% of the population) lived in households, none lived in non-institutionalized group quarters, and none were institutionalized.

There were 701 households, 164 (23.4%) had children under the age of 18 living in them, 361 (51.5%) were opposite-sex married couples living together, 57 (8.1%) had a female householder with no husband present, 25 (3.6%) had a male householder with no wife present. There were 28 (4.0%) unmarried opposite-sex partnerships, and 9 (1.3%) same-sex married couples or partnerships. 209 households (29.8%) were one person and 90 (12.8%) had someone living alone who was 65 or older. The average household size was 2.32. There were 443 families (63.2% of households); the average family size was 2.86.

The age distribution was 284 people (17.5%) under the age of 18, 92 people (5.7%) aged 18 to 24, 412 people (25.4%) aged 25 to 44, 528 people (32.5%) aged 45 to 64, and 308 people (19.0%) who were 65 or older. The median age was 46.2 years. For every 100 females, there were 91.1 males.  For every 100 females age 18 and over, there were 86.6 males.

There were 741 housing units at an average density of 1,534.1 per square mile, of the occupied units 517 (73.8%) were owner-occupied and 184 (26.2%) were rented. The homeowner vacancy rate was 1.9%; the rental vacancy rate was 2.6%. 1,171 people (72.1% of the population) lived in owner-occupied housing units and 453 people (27.9%) lived in rental housing units.

2000
At the 2000 census, there were 1,650 people in 704 households, including 449 families, in the city. The racial makeup of the city was 86.36% White, 1.58% Black or African American, 0.85% Native American, 5.15% Asian, 2.55% from other races, and 3.52% from two or more races.  6.61% of the population were Hispanic or Latino of any race.

Of the 704 households 24.4% had children under the age of 18 living with them, 52.7% were married couples living together, 8.7% had a female householder with no husband present, and 36.1% were non-families. 27.1% of households were one person and 9.4% were one person aged 65 or older. The average household size was 2.34 and the average family size was 2.86.

The age distribution was 19.2% under the age of 18, 5.7% from 18 to 24, 27.3% from 25 to 44, 31.9% from 45 to 64, and 15.9% 65 or older. The median age was 44 years. For every 100 females, there were 90.5 males. For every 100 females age 18 and over, there were 85.5 males.

The median income for a household in the city was $59,423, and the median family income  was $70,119. Males had a median income of $48,977 versus $35,500 for females. The per capita income for the city was $30,035. About 2.9% of families and 5.0% of the population were below the poverty line, including 7.4% of those under age 18 and 1.9% of those age 65 or over.

Parks
Del Rey Oaks houses the Frog Pond Wetland Preserve, a  wetland area popular with birders.

Media
Television service for the community comes from the Monterey-Salinas-Santa Cruz designated market area (DMA). Radio stations Monterey-Salinas-Santa Cruz area of dominant influence (ADI) or continuous measurement market (CMM). Locale newspapers include the Monterey County Herald.

See also
 Media in Monterey County
 Coastal California
 List of school districts in Monterey County, California

References

External links

Incorporated cities and towns in California
Cities in Monterey County, California